Chengannur railway station is an 'NSG 3 category' station located at Chengannur in the Indian state of Kerala. It is one of the busiest stations in the –––Ernakulam route, primarily due to the Sabarimala pilgrims. The station is managed by Southern Railway under the Thiruvananthapuram railway division. Chengannur railway station mainly serves the people of Alappuzha and Pathanamthitta district.

History

Significance
Chengannur railway station is the nearest rail station to reach famous pilgrimage places like Sabarimala, Pandalam, Aranmula Parthasarathy Temple, Parumala Church , Maramon and Manjinikkara Church .It is also the nearest railway station of 4 of the 5 Pancha Pandava Temples and Pandavanpara. The railway station has been declared as 'Gateway of Sabarimala' by Indian Railways in 2009. It serves the people of 4 districts - Alappuzha, Kollam ,Pathanamthitta and Kottayam . The proposed Sabari Airport Cheruvally ,Erumeli is 36 kms away from the station.
Chengannur Railway station is the nearest railway station of The proposed Sabari Airport Cheruvally

Facilities

Cloak room

IRCTC restaurant

Wi-Fi connectivity

Computerized Reservation counter

Information counter

Foot over bridge (2 no's)

Subway

Escalator

Lift (at platform no: 1)

2nd class waiting room at Platform no: 1

Shelters for Sabarimala pilgrims

Prepaid auto – taxi counter

prepaid vehicle parking area

24 hrs. KSRTC bus to Pamba during Sabarimala Pilgrim Season and also at 1st & last  day of every Malayalam month

Future expansion plans
A new line linking Chengannur with  via Pandalam, Kottarakkara Kilimanoor and Nedumangad is awaiting approval from the Planning Commission. Another line to Pampa via Pathanamthitta has also been proposed. After the new line materializes, there would be stations at Pandalam, Kottarakkara,

A sub-urban service connecting Chengannur to Trivandrum is under consideration.

See also 

Ernakulam–Kottayam–Kayamkulam line

Mavelikara railway station
Tiruvalla railway station
Changanasseri railway station
Ettumanur railway station
Kottayam railway station

Thiruvananthapuram railway division
Template:Ernakulam–Kottayam–Kayamkulam–Kollam line

References

Thiruvananthapuram railway division
Railway stations in Alappuzha district
Railway stations opened in 1958